Hara Kumar Tagore (also Hara Coomar Tagore) (1798–1858) was a leading land owner, philanthropist, Sanskrit scholar, writer and musician from Calcutta. He belonged to the Pathuriaghata branch of the Tagore family.

Life

He was the eldest son of Gopi Mohan Tagore and headed the Pathuriaghata family after demise of his father.

Hara Kumar Tagore, was learned in the Hindu scriptures, Sanskrit and English. He had compiled critically admired books and assisted Radhakanta Deb (1783–1867) in compiling Sabdakalpadrum.  Further, the noted texts - Haratattva-didhiti (1881), Purashcharana-bodhini (1895) and Shila-chakrarthabodhini were composed by him. The last text deals with various types of stones, which are worshiped as symbol of Narayana. Also he authored a  manual on procedural matters relating to various Tantric rites, particularly Kali worship.

He was a refined musician with a scholarship in Sanskrit and was composer of noted music.

He was the elder brother of  Prasanna Kumar. Hara Kumar died in 1858 ; and was succeeded, as head of the Pathuriaghata branch of family, by his eldest son, Maharaja Sir Jatinodro Mohun Tagore. His other two sons were Shourindramohan and Shoutindramohan.

He had built a temple at Mulijore with his brother Prosona Coomar in memory of his father. Further, he donated monies liberally for benefit of arts and music.

He had built a beautiful mansion - the famed "Emerald Bower,". It was taken over by Government of West Bengal and is now a part of Rabindra Bharati University.

A square in Kolkata is named after him as Hara Kumar Tagore Square.

References

1798 births
1858 deaths
Hara Kumar
Sanskrit scholars from Bengal
Bengali-language writers
Musicians from Kolkata
People from Kolkata
Bengali zamindars
19th-century Indian philanthropists